Tabea Botthof (born 1 June 2000) is a German ice hockey player and member of the German national team, currently playing with the Yale Bulldogs women's ice hockey program in the ECAC Hockey conference of the NCAA Division I.

International play

She represented Germany at the IIHF Women's World Championship tournaments in 2017, 2019, and 2021. As a junior player with the German national under-18 team, she participated in the IIHF U18 Women's World Championship Division I tournaments in 2015 and 2016, the Division I Group A tournament in 2017, and the Top Division Tournament in 2018. At the 2016 Winter Youth Olympics, Botthof represented Germany in the girls' individual skills challenge, where she qualified for the Grand Final and finished in eighth place.

International statistics

References

External links
 
 

2000 births
Living people
German expatriate ice hockey people
German expatriate sportspeople in the United States
German women's ice hockey defencemen
Ice hockey players at the 2016 Winter Youth Olympics
Sportspeople from Landshut
Yale Bulldogs women's ice hockey players